Edavannappara is a town in the Indian state of Kerala. Edavannappara town is 26 km away from Kozhikode city and 33km away from Malappuram. The towns in Malappuram district like Kondotty, Areekode, Calicut Airport, 19 km) (Nilambur) are located near this town and near the Chaliyar river. The main occupations are sand work, agriculture, etc.

Shopping hub
Edavannappara is a shopping hub and has media for people from neighboring panchayats like Vazhakkad, Vazhayur, Cheekode and Kizhuparamb. The Edavannappara weekly market functions on every Friday.  Like many other towns in Kerala, the economy of Edavannappara depends heavily on remittances from Gulf countries.  Edavannappara is the major market nearby and thousands of people interact with this town on a daily basis.  It is on the shore of the river Chaliyar. Many farmers belong to Edavannappara and they depend mainly on the water from Chaliyar. So Chaliyar is known as the vein of Edavannappara. Major hospitals in Edavannappara are the Medical Trust hospital and Ashi Hospital.
MC Mall is in Edavannappara. edavannappara in first media studio (white media) more than 6 normal studios 100 more marketing shops 10 hotels for ex..
G.U.P.S. Chaliyapram is situated in the heart of Edavannappara.  It is the only major school in Edavannappara and it has a history of more than 100 years.

Agriculture
A lot of people from Edavannappara are now seriously entering agricultural activities.  The recent events in Gulf countries forced them to think in this way like the Nitaqat issue of Saudi Arabia.  They recognised an agricultural career has more value now than earlier.  The farmers have good support available from authorities and from markets.  The modern facilities and services are there for successful farming. The fertilisers are available to the farmers at very supportive costs.

Tourism

Edavannappara is a very scenic village and there is a lot of tourist potential here. The undulating hills in the neighbouring villages can be utilized to make it a world class picnic location. Three kilometres away lies the even more attractive Elamaram village on the Chaliyar river. There is a ferry service here that can take you to the northern side of the Chaliyar river. The ticket is Rs.5.00 and the motor boat service is available every half an hour between 6:40 a.m. and 8:40 p.m. including Sundays.

Even though this is a tiny village, the shopping facilities available are quite surprisingly elaborate. The malls and spacious shops of the town give it an upmarket look. There are also many theme restaurants here.

Famous persons
Sri Elamaram Kareem former minister and communist leader
Sri E. T. Mohammed Basheer former minister and Member of Parliament
Mubarak Edavannappara (Media Wing Chairman, Samastha_Kerala_Sunni_Students_Federation

Culture

Temple

 Kalkipuri Temple is situated in the birthplace of Kalki, 200 meter away from Edavannappara bus station. (Late) Kizhakkumbatt Illathth Damodaran Namboothirippad is the grandfather of Kalki who was land lord. In Kalkipuri Temple devotees pray directly to Lord Brahma, Lord Shiva and Lord Vishnu irrespective of their caste, religion, gender, age nativity etc. Temple have Sreekovil (Sanctum sanctorum), Prarthana Mandapam (Prayer Hall) & 18 steps. Temple opening timing is : 3 AM to 10 PM. Patented Insect Free Oil Lamps (Design Patent Nos.225592 & 301639) are used in this temple for worships.

Transportation
Eavannappara village connects to other parts of India through Kondotty town on the west and Nilambur town on the east.  National highway No. 66 passes through Kondotty and the northern stretch connects to Goa and Mumbai.  The southern stretch connects to Cochin and Trivandrum.  State Highway No. 28 starts from Nilambur and connects to Ooty, Mysore and Bangalore through Highways 12, 29 and 181. The nearest airport is at Kozhikode.  The nearest major railway station is at Feroke.

Nearby places
 Kondotty
 Omanoor
 Edavanna
 Areekode
 Elamaram
 Vazhakkad

References

External links

Villages in Malappuram district
Kondotty area